C. Hahne Mühlenwerke GmbH & Co. KG, also known simply as Hahne, is a German producer of cereals founded in 1848 by Carl Dietrich Hahne. The company's headquarters are in Löhne and it currently has over 135 Employees and produces over 250 different cereal products.

List of product categories 

 Cornflakes
 Filled cereals
 Cereal flakes
 Crunchy muesli
 Multi-flakes
 Cereal bars
 Muesli
 Sweet cereals

Recent developments

External links 
 Official website

Companies based in North Rhine-Westphalia
Food and drink companies of Germany